The Fairness for High Skilled Immigrants Act is proposed United States federal legislation that would reform U.S. immigration policy, primarily by removing per-country limitations on employment-based visas, increasing the per-country numerical limitation for family-sponsored immigrants, and for other purposes. In 2020, for the first time it passed by House and Senate; however, the House and Senate versions were different and required reconciliation, and that reconciliation could not be carried out before the expiration of the 116th Congress. In order for the proposed legislation to further progress, it would have to be reintroduced into the 117th Congress and pass the House and Senate again.

Objective 
The bill intend to amend the Immigration and Nationality Act to: 
(1) eliminate the per country numerical limitation for employment-based immigrants, and 
(2) increase the per country numerical limitation for family based immigrants from 7% to 15% of the total number of family-sponsored visas.

History  
The Fairness for High Skilled Immigrants Act was first introduced by Rep. Lofgren, Zoe in the 110th congress [2007-2008] , which intended to eliminate the 7% annual numerical cap on applicants' birth country in the US Employment based immigration. It has been introduced by various law-makers with bi-partisan support in almost every congress since then, either as a stand-alone bill or as an amendment with other bill.

H.R.392 - Fairness for High-Skilled Immigrants Act of 2017 
The bill, H.R.392 was originally introduced in the U.S. House of Representatives in January of 2017 by Representative Chaffetz. On July 11th 2017, Representative Yoder assumed first sponsorship of H.R.392 with unanimous consent, for the purpose of adding cosponsors and requesting reprintings pursuant to clause 7 of rule XII, without objection. 
The bill got 329 cosponsors, which includes 25 original sponsors.

Bill summary 
This bill amends the Immigration and Nationality Act to: 
(1) eliminate the per-country numerical limitation for employment-based immigrants, and 
(2) increase the per-country numerical limitation for family-based immigrants from 7% to 15% of the total number of family-sponsored visas.
The Chinese Student Protection Act of 1992 is amended to eliminate the provision requiring the reduction of annual Chinese immigrant visas to offset status adjustments under such Act.

The bill establishes a transition period during which a percentage of employment-based second and third preference (EB-2 and EB-3) immigrant visas are reserved as follows
1. for FY2017, 15% of the annual employment based visas are reserved for non-backlogged countries
2. for FY2018, 10% of the annual employment based visas are reserved for non-backlogged countries
3. for FY2019. 10% of the annual employment based visas are reserved for non-backlogged countries
During the transition period, not more than 25% of the total number of the reserved EB-2 and EB-3 visas shall be allotted to natives of a single country.

H.R.1044 : Fairness for High-Skilled Immigrants Act of 2020 
The bill, H.R. 1044, was introduced in the U.S. House of Representatives in February of 2019 by Democratic Congresswoman Zoe Lofgren of California's 19th Congressional District. It was considered and substantially amended in the U.S. Senate (S.386). The two versions of the bill differed such that they had to be reconciled in conference committee prior to final passage and signature by the President. Congressional proponents sought an alternative procedural approach to passage of the bill of placing key provision of the bill into an omnibus spending bill. However, on December 21, 2020, Congresswoman Lofgren issued a statement which indicates that Congress was not able to reconcile the House and Senate versions of the bill, nor attach key provisions to the omnibus spending bill prior to the end of the 2019-2020 congressional calendar. This statement was an apparent concession that the bill had no realistic possibility of passage in its then-current form in the 116th Congress, but Lofgren's statement does seem to imply that she will reintroduce similar legislation in the future.

Key provisions

Per-country employment-based visa limitation 
In the 1924, Congress imposed the first-ever quota on US immigration, but rather than just a worldwide limit, it also distributed the numbers between countries in order to give preference to immigrants from Eastern Hemisphere. In 1965, Congress repealed this system with one that allowed immigrants from any country to receive up to a maximum of seven percent of the green cards issued each year. This was an improvement, but is an anachronism today and it is causing its own pointless discrimination, by causing disparity in the wait times based on the applicant's birth country. Prospective employment-based Immigrants born in countries with large populations, have wait times from decades to over a century,  while the Immigrants born in lower population countries might wait as little as a year or less for their employment-based visas. The primary proposal of this bill is to eliminate the birth country reservation on employment-based visas to prioritize the immigrant petitions based on their application date in all employment-based immigration categories without increasing the annual limit of 1 million Green cards a year. If enacted, this bill would create equal wait time for immigrants in employment-based visas irrespective of where they were born.

Per-country family-based visa limitation 
Family-based visas allow for U.S. citizens and lawful permanent residents, or "green card" holders, to assist family members from abroad in obtaining a lawful entry – U.S. citizens can bring more distant relatives. Current U.S. immigration law limits family-based immigrant visas to 7% from any given country. But rather than eliminating this cap, the bill would increase it to 15% per country.

Transition period 
The House and Senate versions of the bill both contain transition, or "phase-out" timelines that reserve a percentage of EB-2 and EB-3 green cards for immigrants of non-Chinese or Indian origin. The two versions differ substantially in the length of this transition period, with the House version being three years, and the Senate version being eleven years.

Chinese Communist Party affiliation 
According the Atlantic, there are around 82 million members of the Chinese Communist Party (CCP), many of whom join China's ruling party as "the ultimate resume booster," though they may have little-to-no philosophical or ideological ties to communism itself. The Senate version of the bill (S.386) contains a provision that requires immigration officials not to "adjust status of any alien affiliated with the military forces of the People's Republic of China or the Chinese Communist Party. Critics of this provision argue that the addition of this "xenophobic" language was done at the direction of President Donald Trump, who maintained harsh rhetoric and policies toward China throughout his presidency, and has the effect of "scapegoating" and banning many Chinese nationals who may have Chinese military service, yet are unlikely to commit espionage or treason if given the opportunity to immigrate to the U.S.

Legislative history 

 02/07/2019 - Introduced in House
 02/07/2019 - Introduced in Senate
 06/27/2019 - Senator Rand Paul Blocked Unanimous Consent to create a visa carve-out for nurses
 07/10/2019 - Passed/agreed to in House: On motion to suspend the rules and pass the bill, as amended Agreed to by the Yeas and Nays: (2/3 required): 365 - 65 (Roll no. 437).
 07/19/2019 - Senator Chuck Grassley amended S386 to include provisions relating to the H-1B program and labor condition applications.
 09/19/2019 - Senator David Perdue Blocked Unanimous Consent.
 10/17/2019 - Senator Dick Durbin Blocked Unanimous Consent.
 08/05/2020 - Senator Dick Durbin amended S386 and released the hold.
 08/05/2020 - Senator Rick Scott Blocks Durbin, Lee Compromise Unanimous Consent.
 12/02/2020 - Senate Committee on the Judiciary discharged by Unanimous Consent.
 12/02/2020 - Passed/agreed to in Senate: Passed Senate with an amendment by Voice Vote.

Support 
Support for this legislation comes largely from United States science and technology companies, particularly from Silicon Valley, who have recruited Indian and Chinese immigrants who have increasingly studied and excelled in STEM fields in recent years, but are frustrated with the regulatory hurdles these prospective immigrant employees face. Others point to a more humanitarian reasoning, arguing that immigrants from nearly 200 other countries can obtain an employment-based green card in less than one year, while highly skilled immigrants from India face wait times of over a century, which in practical terms, exceeds their life expectancy.

Opposition 
Some opponents of the legislation argue that eliminating per-country employment-based limits would disproportionately benefit Indian and Chinese immigrants at the expense of both immigrants from smaller countries, and thereby eliminating diversity in immigration, as well as American graduates in STEM fields, who tend to expect higher compensation. Other critics suggest that passage of the bill is intended to have this effect, with the end result being a call for the issuance of a larger number of visas in the future, and raise the overall level of immigration into the United States.

References 

Immigration legislation
United States immigration law